Shashlik, or shashlick ( shashlyk), is a dish of skewered and grilled cubes of meat, similar to or synonymous with shish kebab. It is known traditionally by various other names in Iran, the Caucasus, Eastern Europe and Central Asia, and from the 19th century became popular as shashlik across much of the Russian Empire and nowadays in the Russian Federation and former Soviet republics.

Etymology and history 
The word shashlik or shashlick entered English from the Russian shashlyk, of Turkic origin. In Turkic languages, the word shish means skewer, and shishlik is literally translated as "skewerable". Prior to that, the Russian name for meat cooked on a skewer was verchenoye, from vertel, 'spit'. Shashlik did not reach Moscow until the late 19th century. From then on, its popularity spread rapidly; by the 1910s it was a staple in St Petersburg restaurants and by the 1920s it was already a pervasive street food all over urban Russia.

Preparation 

Shashlik was originally made of lamb, but nowadays it is also made of pork, beef, or venison, depending on local preferences and religious observances. The skewers are either threaded with meat only, or with alternating pieces of meat, fat, and vegetables, such as bell pepper, onion, mushroom and tomato. In Iranian cuisine, meat for shashlik (as opposed to other forms of shish kebab) is usually in large chunks, while elsewhere the form of medium-size meat cubes is maintained making it similar to brochette. The meat is marinated overnight in a high-acidity marinade like vinegar, dry wine or sour fruit/vegetable juice with the addition of onions, herbs and spices.

While it is not unusual to see shashlik today listed on the menu of restaurants, it is more commonly sold in many areas in the form of fast food by street vendors who roast the skewers on a mangal over wood, charcoal, or coal. It is also cooked in outdoor environments during social gatherings, similarly to barbecue in English-speaking countries.

See also 
 List of kebabs

References 

Armenian cuisine
Azerbaijani cuisine
Barbecue
Belarusian cuisine
Caucasian cuisine
Central Asian cuisine
Cuisine of Georgia (country)
Iranian cuisine
Iraqi cuisine
Polish cuisine
Skewered kebabs
Kurdish cuisine
Latvian cuisine
Russian cuisine
Grilled skewers
Soviet cuisine
Street food
Tajik cuisine
Turkish cuisine
Turkmenistan cuisine
Ukrainian cuisine
Uzbekistani cuisine